Dashtian (also Romanized as Dashtīān) is a village in Nowkand Kola Rural District, in the Central District of Qaem Shahr County, Mazandaran Province, Iran. At the 2006 census, its population was 34, in 12 families.

References 

Populated places in Qaem Shahr County